Montclair is an unincorporated community in Union Township, Hendricks County, Indiana.

A post office was established at Montclair in 1880, and remained in operation until it was discontinued in 1929.

Geography

References

Unincorporated communities in Hendricks County, Indiana
Unincorporated communities in Indiana
Indianapolis metropolitan area